Thawat Buri is a district (amphoe) of Roi Et province, Thailand.

Geography
The district is in central Roi Et Province. Neighboring districts are (from the north clockwise): Chiang Khwan, Selaphum, Thung Khao Luang, At Samat, and Mueang Roi Et.

History
In 1913 the district was renamed from Uthai Roi Et (อุไทยร้อยเอ็ด) to Saeng Badan (แซงบาดาล). In 1939 it received its current name, Thawat Buri.

Administration
The district is divided into 12 sub-districts (tambons), which are further subdivided into 147 villages (mubans). There are two sub-district municipalities (thesaban tambons). Ban Niwet covers parts of tambon Niwet, Thong Thani covers tambon Thong Thani and parts of Bueng Nakhon. There are a further 11 tambon administrative organizations (TAO).

Missing numbers are tambons which now form Chiang Khwan and Thung Khao Luang Districts.

References

External links
amphoe.com

Thawat Buri